"Black & Proud (Remix)" is the first single released from Tragedy Khadafi's debut album, Intelligent Hoodlum (eponymously named after his then-stage name – Intelligent Hoodlum). Produced and remixed by Marley Marl, the single peaked at 29 on the Hot Rap Singles.

Single track listing
"Black & Proud" (Remix)   
"Black & Proud" (A Capella)   
"Intelligent Hoodlum" (Edit)

Charts

References

1990 debut singles
Tragedy Khadafi songs
A&M Records singles
1990 songs
Songs written by Marley Marl
Song recordings produced by Marley Marl